Michael Fishel (born 1950) is American fantasy visionary artist illustrator.

Early life
Michael Fishel was born to Fredrick and Lorene Fishel in 1950 in Indianapolis, Indiana.

Career
Fantasy art paintings by Michael Fishel published as poster art and cards by Big O Posters London England in 1976, along with artists Roger Dean, Rodney Matthews, Bob Venosa, and Mati Klarwein.

Fantasy Forest - Dungeons & Dragons 1983 - Fantasy Forest is the name of a series of ten Choose Your Own Adventure ... Written by Michael Carr. Illustrated by Michael Fishel. Cover Art by Jeff Easley ...
en.wikipedia.org/wiki/Fantasy_Forest -  T.S.R. Hobbies Dungeons & Dragons ... Amazon.com: Keep of the Ancient King:Fantasy Forest Book 04 ...Amazon.com: Keep of the Ancient King:Fantasy Forest Book 04 ... (9780880380621): Mike Carr, Illustrated by Michael Fishel Cover Art by Keith Parkinson...published 1983.: Books.
www.amazon.com/Keep-Ancient-King-Fantasy.../dp/0880380624 - Cached.

Michael Fishel painted the book cover art for a compilation of great fantasy authors including H. P. Lovecraft and Richard Adams entitled "The Phoniex Tree" printed in 1981 by Avon Books ltd.

A Developmental study of the Alabama Department of Elementary ... - Jan 10example document: Body art jamboree & 43 other titles ..... illustrated by Michael Fishel. Series: A Fantasy Forest book ; ... Michael Fishel Mike Carr (3 documents) example document: Too many chiefs (and not enough indians) w & m Mike ...
www.faqs.org/.../a-developmental-study-of-the-alabama-department-of/ - Cached

References

External links
Official website

1950 births
American speculative fiction artists
Fantasy artists
Living people